"Are You Happy Baby?" is a song written by Bob Stone, and recorded by American country music artist Dottie West.  It was released in December 1980 as the first single from the album Wild West.  "Are You Happy Baby?" was Dottie West's second number one hit as a solo artist.

Other versions
In 1980, Johnny Contardo of Sha Na Na also released a version on his album Changeover.

Charts

References

1981 singles
1980 songs
Dottie West songs
Liberty Records singles
Song recordings produced by Brent Maher